Cellar Darling are a three-piece Swiss progressive metal band from Winterthur and Lucerne, founded in 2016. The group was formed by Anna Murphy (vocals, hurdy-gurdy, flute), Merlin Sutter (drums) and Ivo Henzi (guitars and bass). Cellar Darling incorporates heavy metal, folk, classical, and progressive influences. Notably, the band uses a hurdy-gurdy and a transverse flute. The trio were previously part of the Swiss metal band Eluveitie.

History

Formation
In May 2016 three longtime members of Eluveitie announced their departure from the band. Anna Murphy - female singer and hurdy-gurdy player, Ivo Henzi - guitarist, and Merlin Sutter - drummer parted ways with Eluveitie in a highly publicised split. The exact details of the split were not cited in the press, but wide speculation ensued among fans. In June 2016 the trio announced the creation of Cellar Darling. The band quickly began working on new music for their debut release.

On 23 September 2016 Cellar Darling launched a single called "Challenge" along with the b-side track "Fire, Wind & Earth". The single was self released and the video was created and directed by the band themselves. The musical style of the initial release was a concrete departure from the folk metal genre of their previous band. Cellar Darling played their first shows in December 2016, supporting Amorphis in Zurich, Switzerland and The Gentle Storm in Amsterdam, the Netherlands.

"This Is The Sound" and signing to Nuclear Blast
In January 2017 the trio announced their signing to a German independent metal label Nuclear Blast Records, and that their debut album would be released through the label the following summer.

In May, it was announced that Cellar Darling's first album would be titled This Is the Sound and was to be released on 30 June 2017. A tracklist of the album was introduced.

Cellar Darling released their second ever single called "Black Moon" on 19 May 2017, along with a music video. This was followed on 17 June 2017 with a third single, "Avalanche". Both videos were shot in Tenerife. 

The debut album was released on 30 June 2017 to widespread critical acclaim.

"The Spell"
On 2 November 2018 "Insomnia" was released, accompanied by a music video created by Costin Chioreanu.

Cellar Darling's second album The Spell was released on 22 March 2019 on Nuclear Blast Records. "The Spell" is a concept album telling a story of "an unnamed girl who is birthed into a world that is full of pain, damaged and debilitated by the human beings that inhabit it".

Members
 Anna Murphy – lead vocals, hurdy-gurdy, flute, keyboards (2016–present)
 Ivo Henzi – guitars, bass (2016–present)
 Merlin Sutter – drums (2016–present)

Live musicians
 Nicolas Winter – bass (2017–present)
Rafi Kirder – bass (2016)
 Rachel G - bass (U.S. Tour 2022)

Guest musicians
Shir-Ran Yinon – violin (2016–2017, 2018)
Brendan Wade – uilleann pipes (2016–2017)
Fredy Schnyder – piano (2016–2017)

Discography

Albums
 This Is the Sound (2017)
 The Spell (2019)

Singles
 "Challenge" - 2016
 "Avalanche" - 2017
 "Black Moon" - 2017
 "Insomnia" - 2018

Music videos
 Challenge
 Black Moon
 Avalanche
 Six days
 Insomnia
 The Spell
 Death
 Drown

References

External links
 

Celtic metal musical groups
Swiss folk metal musical groups
Musical groups established in 2016
Swiss heavy metal musical groups
Melodic death metal musical groups
2016 establishments in Switzerland